Bughouse can refer to:

 A psychiatric hospital
 Bughouse chess
 Operation Bughouse, an alternate name for the fictional Battle of Klendathu in Robert A. Heinlein's novel Starship Troopers
 Bughouse (band). 
 Bughouse Bay on the north side of Drury Inlet in the Central Coast of British Columbia, Canada
Bughouse Lake, immediately behind and north of Bughouse Bay

See also
Bug-out (disambiguation)